Kinngarjuaq (Inuktitut syllabics: ᑭᙵᕐᔪᐊᖅ) formerly Juet Island is an uninhabited island located in the Qikiqtaaluk Region, Nunavut, Canada. It is a Baffin Island offshore island in Hudson Strait.

Other islands in the immediate vicinity include: Lavoie Island, Wishart Island, Nuvursirpaaraaluk Island, Lee Island, Qaqqannalik, Poodlatee Island, Anguttuaq, Black Bluff Island, Aulatsiviit, Ijjuriktuq, Ivvitsa, Takijualuk, and Uugalautiit Island. Eight pre-Dorset or early Dorset culture sites were excavated on the island and a nearby area on Baffin Island.

References

Islands of Baffin Island
Islands of Hudson Strait
Uninhabited islands of Qikiqtaaluk Region